Lela Javakhishvili (born 23 April 1984) is a Georgian chess player who holds the titles of International master and Woman Grandmaster.

She has won the Georgian women's chess championship twice, and competed in the Women's World Chess Championship four times, most recently in 2012 when she made it to the third round.

External links 

1984 births
Living people
Chess International Masters
Chess woman grandmasters
Female chess players from Georgia (country)